The Meiji Cup is an annual event on the LPGA of Japan Tour since 1978. The tournament is held in Hokkaido recently at the Sapporo Kokusai Golf Club. The 2015 prize fund is ¥90,000,000 with ¥16,200,000 going to the winner.

Winners
Meiji Cup
2022 Lee Min-young
2021 Cancelled
2020 Cancelled
2019 Bae Seon-woo
2018 Mami Fukuda
2017 Haruka Morita-WanyaoLu
2016 Lee Bo-mee
2015 Yukari Nishiyama
2014 Jiyai Shin
2013 Da-Ye Na
2012 Shanshan Feng
2011 Shanshan Feng

Meiji Chocolate Cup
2010 Yuri Fudoh
2009 Jeon Mi-jeong
2008 Yuri Fudoh
2007 Shiho Oyama
2006 Jeon Mi-jeong

Chateraise Queen's Cup
2005 Junko Omote
2004 Akiko Fukushima

Toyo Suishan Ladies Hokkaido
2003 Kaori Suzuki
2002 Chihiro Nakajima
2001 Chieko Amanuma
2000 Junko Yasui
1999 Toshimi Kimura
1998 Michie Ohba
1997 Kaori Higo
1996  Ok-Hee Ku 
1995 Aki Nakano
1994 Hiromi Takamura
1993 Nayumi Murai
1992 Atsuko Hikage
1991 Aiko Takasu
1990 Norimi Terasawa
1989 Ai-Yu Tu
1988 Aiko Takasu

Hokkaido Women's Open
1987 Ai-Yu Tu
1986 Ai-Yu Tu
1985 Kayoko Ikoma
1984 Reiko Kashiwado
1983 Wu Ming
1982 Ai-Yu Tu
1981 Keiko Matsuda
1980 Takako Kiyomoto
1979 Tatsuko Ohsako
1978 Tatsuko Ohsako

External links
 

LPGA of Japan Tour events
Golf tournaments in Japan
Sport in Hokkaido